Mariba is an unincorporated community in Menifee County, Kentucky, United States. It lies along U.S. Route 460 and Kentucky Route 77, southeast of the city of Frenchburg, the county seat of Menifee County.  Its elevation is 1,175 feet (358 m). The community is part of the Mount Sterling Micropolitan Statistical Area.

The name "Mariba" is taken from Mariba Osborne Taylor.

References

External links
Photo including Mariba Osborne Taylor

Unincorporated communities in Menifee County, Kentucky
Unincorporated communities in Kentucky
Mount Sterling, Kentucky micropolitan area